The Karun-4 Dam is an arch dam on the Karun River located at 180 km southwest of Shahr-e-Kord in the province of Chaharmahal and Bakhtiari, Iran. The Karun has the highest discharge of all the Iranian rivers. Its construction is aimed at electric power supply of 2107 million kWh annually and controlling floods in the upper Karun.

The arch dam design is an ideal one for a dam built in a narrow, rocky gorge to hold back water in a reservoir. The dam is curved. Because of the arch shape, the force of the backed up water presses downward against the dam and has the effect of strengthening the dam foundation.
The dam's first study was conducted in 1995 and river diversion began in 1997. Concrete pouring began in 2006 and the power plant began producing electricity in November 2010. On December 11, 2010, the second generator for the dam became operational and was connected to the grid. The dam will eventually have an installed capacity of 1,020 MW. The dam was inaugurated on 6 July 2011 by Iranian President Mahmood Ahmadinejad.

Objectives
It was built to fulfill the followings: 
To produce an average annual hydropower energy as much as 2100 GW-h.
To join the cascade dams on the Karun River, hence  regulate the flow in order to supply the water required by the  industry and agriculture downstream.
To control the destructive floods of the Karun River.

Cost
The dam construction was costed 8600 billion Rials financed by public resources including national and local budget, domestic banks facilities, bonds, as well as foreign facilities (finance, loan, etc.).Initial estimate of annual income from the electricity production amounted to 1353 billion Rials (642 Rials per kilo watt hour).

Build Contractor
1. Daelim (Korea) + Sato (Japan): Main Civil Works
2. Ilbau (Austria) + Forman (Iran): Preconstruction Works
3. Machine Sazi Arak (Iran): Hydraulic Steel Structures
4. Farab (Iran) + Harbin (China): Mechanical Equipment
5. Farab (Iran) + Elin (Austria): Electrical I&C and HVAC Equipment
6. IEO (Iran): GIS Switchgear

See also

List of power stations in Iran

References 

Hydroelectric power stations in Iran
Reservoirs in Iran
Buildings and structures in Chaharmahal and Bakhtiari Province
Dams in Khuzestan Province
Dams completed in 2010
Arch dams
Dams on the Karun River
Energy infrastructure completed in 2011
2011 establishments in Iran
Tourist attractions in Chaharmahal and Bakhtiari Province